Daniela Nieves (born July 4, 1997) is an American actress best known for playing Andi Cruz on the Nickelodeon series Every Witch Way and WITS Academy. Nieves's other appearances include Una Maid en Manhattan, El Rostro de Analía and La viuda de Blanco.

She was born in Venezuela and moved to the United States when she was 4 months old.

Filmography

References

External links
 
 

1997 births
Living people
American child actresses
American television actresses
21st-century American actresses